Lynher may refer to:
 River Lynher in Cornwall
 Lynher (electoral division), an electoral division of Cornwall
 Lynher, Tamar Barge 
 Lynher, one of the Torpoint Ferries